The 2016 Cincinnati Bearcats football team represented the University of Cincinnati in the 2016 NCAA Division I FBS football season. The Bearcats were led by fourth-year head coach Tommy Tuberville, played their home games at Nippert Stadium, and were members of the East Division of the American Athletic Conference. They finished the season 4–8, 1–7 in American Athletic play to finish in a three-way tie for fourth place in the East Division. For the first time since 2010, the Bearcats were not eligible for a bowl game.

Schedule

Schedule Source:

Game summaries

UT–Martin

at Purdue

Houston

Miami (OH)

South Florida

at UConn

East Carolina

at Temple

BYU

at UCF

Memphis

at Tulsa

Roster

Depth chart
As of September 27, 2016

Awards and milestones

Players in the 2017 NFL Draft

References

Cincinnati
Cincinnati Bearcats football seasons
Cincinnati Bearcats football